Sergei Evglevski (born 15 October 1997) is an Australian sports shooter. Evglevski competed in the men's 25 metre rapid fire pistol event at the 2020 Summer Olympics. He did not score sufficient points to advance past qualification.

References

External links
 Sergei Evglevski at the Australian Olympic Committee

1997 births
Living people
Australian male sport shooters
Olympic shooters of Australia
Shooters at the 2020 Summer Olympics
Place of birth missing (living people)
Sportspeople from Minsk
Belarusian emigrants to Australia
Australian people of Belarusian descent
Sportspeople from Melbourne
Naturalised citizens of Australia